The 2021 Miami FC season was the club's second season in the USL Championship, the second-tier of American soccer, and seventh overall.

Roster 

Appearances and goals are career totals from all-competitions and leagues.

Staff
  Paul Dalglish – Head coach
  Jed Davies – Assistant coach
  Andy Thomson – Assistant coach

Transfers

In

Out

Loan in

Friendlies

Competitive

USL Championship

Standings — Atlantic Division

Results summary

Match results

USL Championship Playoffs

U.S. Open Cup 

As a team playing in a recognized professional league, Miami normally automatically qualified for the U.S. Open Cup. However, with the 2021 edition shorted due to the COVID-19 pandemic, the Championship has only been allotted four teams spots. On March 29, US Soccer announced the four teams taking part from the league with Miami being left out.

On July 20, U.S. Soccer announced that the 2021 tournament was cancelled.

Squad statistics

Appearances and goals 

|-
! colspan="16" style="background:#dcdcdc; text-align:center"| Goalkeepers

|-
! colspan="16" style="background:#dcdcdc; text-align:center"| Defenders

|-
! colspan="16" style="background:#dcdcdc; text-align:center"| Midfielders

|-
! colspan="16" style="background:#dcdcdc; text-align:center"| Forwards

|-
! colspan="16" style="background:#dcdcdc; text-align:center"| Left during season

|-
|}

Goal scorers

Disciplinary record

Notes

References

External links
 

Miami FC
Miami FC
Miami FC seasons
Miami FC